Nicolas Ceolin (born 10 April 1986) is a Brazilian former footballer.

Career
Ceolin started in football at Gaúcho, playing for other Rio Grande do Sul-based youth clubs until he was transferred to EC Vitoria.

External links 
 

1986 births
Living people
Sportspeople from Rio Grande do Sul
Brazilian footballers
Association football forwards
Brazilian expatriate footballers
Expatriate footballers in Belarus
Expatriate footballers in Hungary
Expatriate footballers in Switzerland
Brazilian expatriate sportspeople in Belarus
Brazilian expatriate sportspeople in Hungary
Nemzeti Bajnokság I players
Esporte Clube Vitória players
União Agrícola Barbarense Futebol Clube players
FC Darida Minsk Raion players
FC Partizan Minsk players
FC Neman Grodno players
Győri ETO FC players
Budapest Honvéd FC players
Pécsi MFC players
A.C. Bra players
AC Bellinzona players